Sigma Centauri, Latinized from σ Centauri, is the Bayer designation for a solitary star in the southern constellation of Centaurus. It is visible to the naked eye with an apparent visual magnitude of 3.91. The distance to Sigma Centauri, based upon an annual parallax shift of 7.92 mas, is around 412 light years.

This is a B-type main sequence star with a stellar classification of B3 V. It is a helium-rich star, the most massive type of chemically peculiar star. Sigma Centauri has around 6.8 times the mass of the Sun and 4.5 times the Sun's radius. It has a relatively high rate of spin with a projected rotational velocity of 169 km/s, and is around 25 million years old. The star radiates 1,101 times the solar luminosity from its outer atmosphere at an effective temperature of 15,744 K. It is a member of the Lower Centaurus Crux component of the Scorpius–Centaurus association.

References

B-type main-sequence stars
Lower Centaurus Crux
Centaurus (constellation)
Centauri, Sigma
Durchmusterung objects
108483
060823
4743